Baap Beti is a 1954 Bollywood film, produced by Gopi Rohra and starring Nalini Jaiwant. It stars Asha Parekh as a child artist.

Songs
 "Duniya Bananewale Ramoji" - Lata Mangeshkar
 "Koyal Bole Ku Papiha Bole Pi" - Lata Mangeshkar
 "Le Chal Ri Nindiya Le Chal Hame Tu Chanda" - Lata Mangeshkar
 "Andhere Se Ujale Ki Taraf Le Ja Hame" - Lata Mangeshkar

References

External links
 

1954 films
Films directed by Bimal Roy
Films scored by Roshan
1950s Hindi-language films
Indian drama films
1954 drama films
Indian black-and-white films